13th Child (or The 13th Child: Legend of the Jersey Devil) is a 2002 direct-to-video horror film directed by Thomas Ashley and Steven Stockage. It is inspired by the Jersey Devil. The screenplay was written by Michael Maryk and Cliff Robertson, who also stars in the film. The story is based on The Jersey Devil by James F. McCloy and Ray Miller Jr. The film was shot in New Jersey at Wharton State Forest, Batsto Village, and Hammonton in the Pine Barrens of New Jersey.

Cast 
 Cliff Robertson as Mr. Shroud
 Lesley-Anne Down as District-Attorney Murphy
 Christopher Atkins as Ron
 Robert Guillaume as Riley
 John Wesley as Jones
 Peter Jason as Coroner

Reception 
Critical reception for the film has been negative. On Rotten Tomatoes the film has a rating of 40% based on 5 reviews. David N. Butterworth panned the film, as he felt that "Anyone who quickly denounced Madonna's "Swept Away" as being the worst film of 2002 clearly hadn't seen "13th Child."" Charles Tatum from eFilmCritic.com panned the film's script, and character development.

References

External links 
 
 
 
 13th Child at Turner Classic Movies

2002 films
2002 direct-to-video films
2002 horror films
2000s monster movies
Direct-to-video horror films
Jersey Devil in fiction
Films shot in New Jersey
Films set in New Jersey
American monster movies
2000s English-language films
2000s American films